Francis David Egerton (born 21 September 1959) is a British novelist from the Egerton family. Writing as "Frank Egerton", he works as a tutor of creative writing at Oxford University and an Oxford University librarian. He reviewed fiction and non-fiction for newspapers including The Times and Financial Times from 1995–2008.

Family
Egerton is a great-great-great-grandson of Francis Egerton, 1st Earl of Ellesmere, second son of George Leveson-Gower, 1st Duke of Sutherland.  He is in the line of succession to the Sutherland dukedom.  He is married to Jess and lives in West Oxfordshire.

Career
Frank Egerton originally qualified as an Associate of the Royal Institution of Chartered Surveyors. He gave up his job as a land agent to sit Oxbridge and read English at Keble College. He is interested in "both the close examination of fiction and how recent technologies such as ebooks and print-on-demand are changing the publishing industry and offering fresh opportunities to writers." His first novel, The Lock, was published in paperback in 2003 and his second, Invisible, was published by StreetBooks in 2010. The ebook version of The Lock reached the finals of the Independent e-Book Awards in Santa Barbara in 2002. In The Times review of Invisible Kate Saunders commented on "the author’s lively wit and acute understanding of the emotional landscape." He is a member of the Society of Authors, Writers in Oxford and the Association of Writers & Writing Programs, and is a former editor of The Oxford Writer. He was Chair of Writers in Oxford from 2008 to 2010.

About Frank Egerton
 Gill Oliver Interview with Frank Egerton

References

External links
 
 justthoughtsnstuff.com
 www.burkespeerage.com

1959 births
Living people
21st-century British novelists
People educated at Stowe School
Alumni of the Royal Agricultural University
Alumni of Keble College, Oxford
British male novelists
Frank
Frank
21st-century British male writers